Professor Craig Kennedy is a character created by Arthur B. Reeve.

Description
Kennedy is a scientist detective at Columbia University similar to Sherlock Holmes and Dr. Thorndyke. He uses his knowledge of chemistry and psychoanalysis to solve cases, and uses exotic (at the time) devices in his work such as lie detectors, gyroscopes, and portable seismographs.

He first appeared in the December 1910 issue of Cosmopolitan, in "The Case of Helen Bond." He ultimately made 82 appearances in Cosmopolitan, the last coming in the August 1918 issue. Twelve stories were reprinted in the first collection, and this continued, but soon the stories were fixed up into a novel, and some were adaptations of movie serials.

He returned for many short stories in magazines as various as The Popular Magazine, Detective Story Magazine, Country Gentleman, Everybody's Magazine, and Flynn's, as well as in 26 novels. Through the 1920s, he became more of a typical detective. Craig Kennedy appeared in a number of 1930s pulp magazines, Complete Detective Novel Magazine, Dime Detective, Popular Detective, Weird Tales, and World Man Hunters, but many of these appear to be ghost-written as they lack the style and flavor of the teen-era Craig Kennedy stories. A series of six Craig Kennedy stories in early issues of Popular Detective are known to have been unsold novelettes rewritten by A. T. Locke.

Books 
The Silent Bullet (1910)
The Poisoned Pen (1911)
Constance Dunlap (1913)
The Dream Doctor (1914)
Guy Garrick (1914)
The Death House (1914)
The War Terror (1915)
The Gold of the Gods (1915)
The Exploits of Elaine (1915) adaption of movie serial
The Social Gangster (1916)
The Ear in the Wall (1916)
The Romance of Elaine (1916) adaption of movie serial
The Triumph of Elaine (1916)
The Treasure Train (1917)
The Adventuress (1917)
The Panama Plot (1918)
The Soul Scar (1919)
The Film Mystery (1921) adaption of Houdini movie serial
The Bacteriological Detective (1922)
Craig Kennedy Listens In (1923)
Atavar, the Dream Dancer (1924)
The Fourteen Points (1925)
The Boy Scouts' Craig Kennedy (1925)
Craig Kennedy on the Farm (1925)
The Radio Detective (1926)
Pandora (1926)
The Kidnap Club (1932)
The Clutching Hand (1934)
Enter Craig Kennedy (1935)
The Stars Scream Murder (1936)

Stories
The Case of Helen Bond (The Silent Cracksman)	Dec 1910
The Silent Bullet	Jan 1911
The Bacteriological Detective	Feb 1911
The Story of) The Deadly Tube	Mar 1911
The Seismograph Adventure	Apr 1911
The Diamond Maker	May 1911
The Azure Ring	Jun 1911
A Spontaneous Combustion	Jul 1911
The Terror in the Air	Aug 1911
The Black Hand	Sep 1911
The Artificial Paradise (The Man Who Was Dead)	Oct 1911
The Steel Door	Nov 1911
The Sand-Hog (The Tunnel Mystery)	Dec 1911
The Bacillus of Death	Jan 1912
The Master Counterfeiter	Feb 1912
The Firebug (The Firefiend)	Mar 1912
The Yeggman	Apr 1912
The Green-Goods King	May 1912
The Poisoned Pen	May 1912
The White Slave	Jun 1912
 The Treasure Vault	Jul 1912
The Forger	Jul 1912
The Unofficial Spy	Aug 1912
 The Smuggler	Sep 1912
The Invisible Ray	Oct 1912
The Campaign Grafter	Nov 1912
The Kleptomaniac	Dec 1912
The Opium Joint	Jan 1913
The Vampire	Feb 1913
The Death Thought	Apr 1913
The Green Curse	Apr 1913
The Sybarite	May 1913
The Phantom Circuit	Jun 1913
The Elixir of Life	Jul 1913
The Dream Doctor	Aug 1913
 The Death House	Sep 1913
The Submarine Mystery	Oct 1913
The Bomb-Maker	Nov 1913
The Ghouls	Dec 1913
The Scientific Gunman	Jan 1914
Guy Garrick (revised book edition of The Scientific Gunman)	1914
The Air-Pirate	Jan 1914
The Abduction Club	Feb 1914
The Billionaire Baby	Feb 1914
The Radium Robber	Mar 1914
The Eugenic Bride	Apr 1914
The Terrorists	May 1914
The Dead-Line	May 1914
The Curio Shop	Jun 1914
The Germ Letter	Jul 1914
 The Wireless Wire-Tappers	Aug 1914
The Family Skeleton	Sep 1914
The Devil-Worshipers	Oct 1914
Happy Dust	Nov 1914
The Murder Syndicate	Dec 1914
The Stolen War-Secret	Dec 1914
The Diamond-Queen	Jan 1915
The X-Ray Detective	Feb 1915
The Tango Thief	Mar 1915
The Supertoxin	Apr 1915
The Sixth Sense	May 1915
The Absolute Zero	Jun 1915
The Sleep-Maker	Jul 1915
The Evil Eye	Aug 1915
The House of Death	Sep 1915
 The Demon Engine	Oct 1915
The Social Gangster	Nov 1915
The Voodoo Mystery	Dec 1915
The Treasure-Train	Jan 1916
The Truth-Detector	Mar 1916
The Soul-Analysis	May 1916
The Mystic Poisoner	Jun 1916
The Phantom Destroyer	Jul 1916
The Beauty-Mask	Aug 1916
The Love-Meter	Sep 1916
The Vital Principle	Oct 1916
The Submarine Mine	Nov 1916
The Rubber Dagger	Dec 1916
The Gun-Runner	Jan 1917
The Sunken Treasure	Feb 1917
The Love-Philter (The Love Potion)	Apr 1917
The Panama Plot	May 1917
The Black Diamond	Jun 1917
The Bitter Water	Jul 1917
The Nitrate King	Aug 1917
The Coca Gang	Oct 1917
The Phantom Parasite	Nov 1917
The Door of Dread	Jan 1918
The Black Cross	Feb 1918
The Psychic Scar	Apr 1918
The Star-Shell	May 1918
The Film Murder	Jun 1918
The Film Tragedy	Jul 1918
The Treason Trust	Jul 1918
The Sinister Shadow	Aug 1918
The Love-Game	Aug 1918
The Soul Scar	Sep 1918
The Green Death	1918
Thicker Than Water	Sep 1923
The Radio Detective	Oct 1923
Dead Men Tell Tales	Oct 1923
The Radio Wraith	Nov 1923
The Hawk	Dec 1923
Deep-Sea Treasure	Jan 1924
The Jazz Addict	Jan 1924
The Counterfeit Beauty	Feb 1924
A Son of the North Woods	Feb 1924
The Polar Flight of ZR-10	Mar 1924
The Honour System	May 1924
The Greatest Mystery	Jul 1924
The Return of the Bon Homme Richard	Jul 1924
TheFrozen Paper	Aug 1924
The Elements: Air	Sep 1924
The Ghost Chase	Sep 1924
Synthetic Love	Sep 1924
The Elements: Fire	Oct 1924
The Elements: Earth	Oct 1924
The Hypocrites	Oct 1924
The Elements: Water	Nov 1924
The Fumes of Folly	Nov 1924
The Voice in the Dark	Nov 1924
The Barn-Burner	Dec 1924
The Compass: North	Dec 1924
The Compass: East	Dec 1924
The Compass: South	Jan 1925
The Compass: West	Jan 1925
The Six Senses: Sight	Jan 1925
 The Gas Tramp	Jan 1925
The Six Senses: Smell	Feb 1925
The Six Senses: Taste	Feb 1925
The Six Senses: Touch	Feb 1925
The Six Senses: Hearing	Feb 1925
The Six Senses: The "Sixth" Sense	Mar 1925
Woman's Wiles	Mar 1925
The Long Arm	Apr 1925
Land Poor	May 1925
 Revenge	May 1925
Dead Beets	Aug 1925
Harvest Home	Nov 1925
Pandora, or: the World Tomorrow	Jan 1926
Craig Kennedy Gets His Girl	Jul 1928
Craig Kennedy Gets the Dope	Jul 1928
Craig Kennedy and the Model	Aug 1928
Craig Kennedy and the Ghost	Aug 1928
Blood Will Tell	Sep 1928
Radiant Doom	Oct 1928
The Dead Line	Oct 1928
Craig Kennedy Splits Hairs	Oct 1928
The Christmas Case	Dec 1928
The Mystery Ray	Feb 1929
The Beauty Wrecker	Mar 1929
Poisoned Music	Aug 1929
The Crime Student	Sep 1929
The Gigolo Mystery	Oct 1929
The Mystery of the Phantom Voice	Nov 1929
The House of a Hundred Murders	Dec 1929
The Mystery in the Mire	Jan 1930
 The Mystery of the Bulawayo Diamond	Jan 1930
The Kidnap Club	Apr 1932
Death in the Cards	May 1932
The Junior League Murder	Jun 1932
Murder Under the Southern Cross	July 1932
Murder Never Dies	Aug 1932
Murder in Green	Sep 1932
Murder on the Mike	Dec 1932
Murder in the Tourist Camp	Dec 1932
The Electric War	Sep 1933
The Golden Grave	Oct 1933
The Inca Dagger	Jan 1934
Murder at Night	Aug 1934
The Death Cry	May 1935

Adaptations
The character's name was spoofed in 1916 by Douglas Fairbanks, who played "Coke Enneday" in the cocaine comedy film and Sherlock Holmes sendup The Mystery of the Leaping Fish.

Herbert Rawlinson portrayed Craig Kennedy in the silent serial film The Carter Case (1919). Robert Warwick took the role in the early sound film Unmasked (1929). Jack Mulhall played Kennedy in the serial The Clutching Hand (1936) for the Weiss Brothers, who also produced the 1951 television series called Craig Kennedy, Criminologist, which was based on the same character. Donald Woods portrayed Craig Kennedy in the television series.

See also
List of fictional medical examiners

References

External links

The Silent Bullet
Gutenberg contains a selection of his works.

Fictional amateur detectives
Fictional scientists
Characters in pulp fiction
Fictional medical examiners
Literary characters introduced in 1910
Book series introduced in 1910